Coleophora coliella is a moth of the family Coleophoridae. It is found in North Africa.

The larvae possibly feed on Atriplex halimus.

References

coliella
Moths described in 1988
Moths of Africa